Roll On may refer to:

Roll On (The Living End album)
"Roll On" (The Living End song)
Roll On (Alabama album)
"Roll On (Eighteen Wheeler)"
Roll On (JJ Cale album)
"Roll On" (Kid Rock song)
"Roll On" (Mis-Teeq song)